Virgil Hnat (1936 – March 21, 2001) was a Romanian handball player and coach who played for Dinamo București and for the national team.

References 

1936 births
2001 deaths
Romanian male handball players
CS Dinamo București (men's handball) players
Romanian handball coaches